Darren Star (born July 25, 1961) is an American writer, director and producer of film and television. He is best known for creating the television series Beverly Hills, 90210 (1990–2000), Melrose Place (1992–1999), Sex and the City (1998–2004), Younger (2015–2021), and Emily in Paris (2020–present).

Early life
Darren Star was born to a Jewish family in Potomac, Maryland. His mother was a freelance writer and his father was an orthodontist. He attended Winston Churchill High School and UCLA where he studied English and Creative Writing.

Career
He created the television series Beverly Hills, 90210 based on his own high school experiences and Melrose Place, and he was the creator and a writer for the HBO series Sex and the City.

He also worked on Central Park West (1995), Grosse Pointe (2000), The $treet (2000), Miss Match (2003), Kitchen Confidential (2005), Runaway (2006) and Cashmere Mafia (2008). He was the producer of Sex and the City: The Movie, which was released in 2008, and its sequel Sex and the City 2, which was released in 2010.

In 2002, he was the recipient of the Austin Film Festival's Outstanding Television Writer Award. He sits on the board of directors of Project Angel Food. In 2020, he signed a deal with ViacomCBS.

Personal life
Star is openly gay. He has residences in New York City and Los Angeles.

Filmography

Creator
 Beverly Hills, 90210 (1990–2000)
 Melrose Place (1992–1999)
 Central Park West (1995–1996)
 Sex and the City (1998–2004)
 Grosse Pointe (2000–2001)
 Miss Match (2003)
 Younger (2015–2021)
 Emily in Paris (2020–present)
 And Just Like That... (2021–present)
 Uncoupled (2022-present)

Screenwriter
 Doin' Time on Planet Earth (1988)
 Dead Heat (1988) (uncredited)
 If Looks Could Kill (1991)

Executive producer
 Melrose Place (1992–1995)
 Beverly Hills, 90210 (1992–1995)
 Central Park West (1995–1996)
 Sex and the City (1998–2000)
 The Street (2000)
 Grosse Pointe (2000–2001)
 Miss Match (2003)
 Kitchen Confidential (2005)
 Runaway (2006)
 Cashmere Mafia (2008)
 GCB (2012)
 Younger (2015–2021)
 Emily in Paris (2020–present)
 Uncoupled (2022-present)

Producer
 Sex and the City (2008)
 Sex and the City 2 (2010)

References

External links

Beverly Hills, 90210 (franchise)
Sex and the City
American male screenwriters
American soap opera writers
American television directors
Television producers from California
1961 births
Living people
American gay writers
Jewish American writers
LGBT Jews
American LGBT screenwriters
LGBT producers
LGBT people from California
LGBT people from Maryland
American male television writers
People from Bel Air, Los Angeles
People from Potomac, Maryland
Showrunners
University of California, Los Angeles alumni
Writers from Los Angeles
20th-century American writers
21st-century American writers
20th-century American male writers
Screenwriters from California
Screenwriters from Maryland
21st-century American Jews
21st-century American LGBT people